is a passenger railway station in the city of Ichikawa, Chiba, Japan, operated by East Japan Railway Company (JR East).

Lines

Station layout
The elevated station consists of two side platforms serving two tracks. The station is staffed. Both platforms have lift access, and wheelchair-accessible toilet facilities are available on the ground floor.

Platforms

History

The station opened on 1 December 1988.

Station numbering was introduced in 2016 Ichikawashiohama being assigned station number JE09.

Passenger statistics
In fiscal 2019, the station was used by an average of 8,086 passengers daily (boarding passengers only). The passenger figures for previous years are as shown below.

Surrounding area

 Gyōtoku Police Station
 
 
 Shiohama No. 1 Park
 Higashi Kaimen Park

Schools
 Gyotoku High School
 Shiohama Junior High School
 Minami-Gyotoku Junior High School
 Fukuei Junior High School
 Shiohama Elementary School
 Minami Niihama Elementary School
 Fukuei Elementary School
 Fumihama Elementary School

Commercial
 Amazon Japan Fulfillment Center

Hotels
 CVS Bay Hotel

See also
 List of railway stations in Japan

References

External links

 Ichikawashiohama Station 
 Keiyo Line Navi - Ichikawashiohama Station  

Railway stations in Chiba Prefecture
Railway stations in Japan opened in 1988
Stations of East Japan Railway Company
Keiyō Line
Musashino Line
Ichikawa, Chiba